was a pair of television jidaigeki series on TV Asahi in Japan. The first aired in 1990–1991 and the sequel in 1992–1993. Kunihiko Mitamura portrayed Tokugawa Iemitsu in both series.

The show premiered on October 13, 1990, as an off-season replacement for the popular Abarenbo Shogun. It shared several cast members with Abarenbo Shogun, including Reiko Takashima, Ayako Tanaka and some minor guest actors. The final episode aired on March 30, 1991. The sequel ran during the same months of 1992–1993.

Story
In 1634, the third Tokugawa shogun Iemitsu visited Kyoto in a lavish procession, accompanied by more than 300,000 followers. The premise of the television series is that he refused to ride in the palanquin. Instead, he walked in disguise as Tokuyama Takenoshin, a ronin. Accompanying him were Yagyū Jūbei, Isshin Tasuke, a pickpocket named Otsuta, and male and female ninja. Riding in the palanquin was a kagemusha, an actor named Shinkichi. His entourage included Ōkubo Hikozaemon, Lady Kasuga, Matsudaira Nobutsuna, and various ladies-in-waiting. Going to Kyoto, the entourage followed the Tōkaidō. At various places along the way, a (fictional) half-brother of Iemitsu, Tsuzuki, attempted to assassinate him, with the assistance of Fūma ninja.

The sequel, Shogun Iemitsu Shinobi Tabi Part II, depicts the return to Edo. This time the group travels along the Nakasendō, passing through territory that had recently been held by the Sanada clan. Takenoshin rescues a princess (Shizu, in disguise under the name Isuzu), who, viewers later learn, is a daughter of Ishida Mitsunari in league with Mugensai, formerly the chief ninja of the late Ishida Mitsunari. Mugensai has lied to the princess in order to get her to assassinate Iemitsu.

Cast
Kunihiko Mitamura as Tokugawa Iemitsu disguised as Tokuyama Takenoshin
Korokke as Shinkichi
Hisako Manda as Otsuta
Toyokazu Minami as Isshin Tasuke
Hiroshi Katsuno as Yagyū Jūbei
Shigeru Kōyama as Ōkubo Hikozaemon
Ryō Tamura as Matsudaira Izu no Kami Nobutsuna (original series)
Reiko Takashima as Kaede, a lady-in-waiting (original series); Makiko Yamada (Part II)
Ayako Tanaka as Aya, a lady-in-waiting
Ken Nishida as Mugensai (Part II)
Yoshimi Ashikawa as Princess Shizu, disguised as Lady Isuzu (Part II)
Yuki Yukie as Kikue, her attendant
Kyōko Tsujisawa as Okaru, lead actress of the traveling company

Notes

References
 Jansen, Marius B. (1995). Warrior Rule in Japan. Cambridge: Cambridge University Press. ;  OCLC 422791897

This article includes material from 将軍家光忍び旅 (Shōgun Iemitsu Shinobi Tabi) in the Japanese Wikipedia, retrieved on September 23, 2007.

1990 Japanese television series debuts
1993 Japanese television series endings
Jidaigeki television series
TV Asahi original programming
Cultural depictions of Tokugawa Iemitsu